Collected Poems of Robert Frost is a collection of poetry written by Robert Frost and published in 1930 by Henry Holt and Company in New York.

Contents
The collection consisted of Robert Frost's first five poetry books:
	
A Boy's Will (1913);
North of Boston (1914);
Mountain Interval (1916);
New Hampshire (1923); and,
West-Running Brook (1928).

Reception
Frost received a Pulitzer prize in 1931 for the collection. One of the books in the collection, New Hampshire, had received the Pulitzer Prize in 1924.

A special edition was printed after the book won the Pulitzer Prize with a red band around the front and back covers. The front cover banner read: "Pulitzer Prize Poems: 1930: This edition contains Mr. Frost's complete work to date; including six poems never hitherto published and New Hampshire, for which he was awarded the Pulitzer Prize in 1923." The back cover banner featured a quote from Hugh Walpole: "More sure of immortality than any book published in the last five years." The frontispiece featured a photograph of the author with his signature under it.

References

External links
LibriVox audio recording of ''A Boy's Will".

LibriVox audio recording of New Hampshire.

1930 poetry books
Poetry by Robert Frost
Pulitzer Prize for Poetry-winning works
American poetry collections
Works by Robert Frost